Legendary Classics Volume 1 is a compilation album by American rapper R.A. the Rugged Man, released on 27 October 2009, on Nature Sounds. The album is a collection of unreleased and rare tracks from R.A. the Rugged Man. The album features The Notorious B.I.G., Havoc, Kool G Rap, Buckwild, Ayatollah, Jedi Mind Tricks, Sadat X, Akinyele, Tragedy, J-Live, Human Beatbox Bub and others. "Uncommon Valor", featuring hip hop group Jedi Mind Tricks, was originally released on their 2006 album Servants in Heaven, Kings in Hell.

Track listing

References

2009 albums
R.A. the Rugged Man albums
Nature Sounds albums
Albums produced by Havoc (musician)
Albums produced by Ayatollah
Albums produced by Buckwild